The 2017 Asian Winter Games was the 8th edition of the Asian Winter Games. They were hosted in Sapporo and Obihiro in Hokkaido, Japan. These Games were originally scheduled for 2015, however, in the Olympic Council of Asia's general assembly in Singapore on 3 July 2009, the committee decided to move the Games to one year before the Winter Olympics moving forward. The games began on 19 February with the opening ceremony (the curling and hockey events begin the day before) and ended with the closing ceremony on 26 February.

Sapporo and Obihiro were named as the host cities on January 31, 2011, as the sole bidding cities. The hosting contract was signed by Tsunekazu Takeda, the president of the Japanese Olympic Committee. It will be the third time that Sapporo will host the event and fourth time in Japan. Previously the city held the two first editions of the Games in 1986 and 1990. Before hosting the first Asian Winter Games, the city was also the host of the 1972 Winter Olympics and the 1991 Winter Universiade.

Bid
On 31 January 2011, Sapporo was awarded the right to host the Games. The decision was announced at the OCA's general assembly during the 2011 Asian Winter Games in Astana, Kazakhstan. The bid was announced by Mayor Fumio Ueda on 15 January 2011, with no other bidding city. The total cost is expected to be ¥3.5 billion.

Development and preparation

Venues

Athletes village
Athletes and officials staying at the games stayed at hotels in Sapporo and Obihiro (for speed skating). There was no traditional dedicated village that was built for the games.

Main Media Center
The Main Media Center (MMC) housed both the International Broadcasting Center (IBC) and the Main Press Center (MPC). These were housed at the Sapporo Convention Center.

Competition venues

A total of 13 venues were scheduled to be used for the games. Some of the venues were also used during the 1972 Winter Olympics. All venues were located within the Sapporo region, except the speed skating venue which was in Obihiro.

Medals
The medal design was revealed on December 21, 2016. The medals were cut using diamonds and the three stars on them are curved to look like ice. The three stars are meant to represent athletes as "Stars of Hope". The diamond-cut surface is also meant to represent the fresh air in the winter along with the snow and ice seen across Hokkaido. The three kind of medals also weight differently, with the gold weighing the most, followed by silver and finally bronze.

Tickets
The pre-sale of tickets for select events and the opening ceremony started on September 12, 2016, while tickets went on general sale for all events on November 14, 2016. Alpine skiing, freestyle skiing, snowboard parallel events, speed skating and the third division of the men's hockey tournament were free admission. With a month to go till the start of the games, only 30% of tickets were sold. The only event to be sold out at that time was the men's halfpipe competition in snowboarding, which resulted in more tickets being released for the event.

Torch relay

The torch was lit on February 5 at the Sapporo Snow Festival being held at the Odori Park located in central Sapporo. The ceremony involved a lighting ritual presentation made by the Ainu people, indigenous from Hokkaido island . The relay in itself only lasted one day (on February 6), with the closing of the day seeing the Kamuinomi, which was one of main rituals of the Ainu people. The ritual involved praying for the success of all the athletes taking part in the games. From February 7 to the 17th, the flame be split and then displayed at the City Halls of both Sapporo and Obihiro, as well as the 10 ward offices of Sapporo. The main cauldron was in on front of the Sapporo City Hall and also used for the 1972 Winter Olympics torch relay local celebrations, until one hour before the Closing Ceremony, on February 26,when the games main cauldron was relighted.

The Games

Opening ceremony

The opening ceremony of the games took place on 19 February at the Sapporo Dome. The show included a special performance by Japanese pop band Dreams Come True. In addition to the traditional protocol elements, this ceremony was marked by innovative elements such as the schedule and the holding of two award ceremonies that had to be brought forward due to the Games calendar among the cultural elements that the Ainu people was invited to be part.

Closing ceremony
The closing ceremony of the games took place on 26 February at the conclusion of the men's event in the figure skating. The ceremony was held at the Makomanai Ice Arena and also included an exhibition gala by some of the figure skaters who took part in competition.

Sports
64 events across 11 winter sport disciplines, were scheduled in the 2017 Asian Winter Games program. The five ice sports are curling, figure skating, speed skating, short-track speed skating and ice hockey.Present at the 2011 edition:bandy and Ski orienteering were dropped by the Organizing Committee. The five snow sports are alpine, biathlon cross-country, freestyle, ski jumping, and snowboarding. Due to infrastructure issues and also established in the OCA regulations, four sports that are on the program for the Winter Olympics were not part of the program for this edition: bobsleigh, luge, Nordic combined, and skeleton.
Numbers in parentheses indicate the number of medal events contested in each sports discipline.

Participating National Olympic Committees 

32 NOCs (including the two invited Oceania NOCs) competed. Indonesia, Sri Lanka, Timor-Leste, Turkmenistan and Vietnam made their debuts. Three additional countries were scheduled to participate: Afghanistan (did not submit entries by the deadline), Cambodia and Iraq (were not members of the International Skating Union, and thus their application to participate was rejected).

After competing at the last edition of the games, Afghanistan, Bahrain and Palestine did not compete here. On the other hand, after missing the last edition, both Macau and Pakistan competed here. Bahrain originally entered a men's ice hockey team but later withdrew, after the government did not approve of the expense of sending the team to the games, amidst a drop in oil prices.

In September 2016, it was announced athletes from Oceania were invited to compete. Countries from Oceania are however listed separately as they are not deemed as official competitors, but are considered as invited guest athletes (therefore they are not eligible for medals).

The Kuwait Olympic Committee was suspended in October 2015, due to political interference. Therefore, the athletes from the country is scheduled to compete under the Olympic flag as Independent Olympic Athletes.

The numbers in parenthesis represents the number of participants entered.

Calendar
Competitions will start the day before the opening ceremony on the 18th, and ending with the figure skating men's free program and closing ceremony. The full schedule can be seen below.

Medal table

Marketing

Mascot

The official mascot of the 2017 Asian Winter Games is named Ezomon. Ezomon is modeled after a very special type of flying squirrel only found in the Hokkaido region of Japan. Ezomon sports a red scarf and a blue cape with the logo of the 2017 Asian Winter Games on it.

Sponsors
There are three tiers of sponsorship for the games, plus the Olympic Council of Asia (OCA) sponsors.

Concerns and controversies

APA Hotel
One of the athletes hotels is the APA Hotel in Sapporo. The founder and president of this hotel chain, Toshio Motoya, who is a strong supporter of political and historical view aligned with those of Japan's right wing. For example, Motoya claimed that "Japanese aggression, the Nanking Massacre, and comfort women" were "fabricated stories" or "fictitious". His book is available in each of the guest rooms at the hotel. This created controversy, particularly in China, which caused the games organizers to ask the hotel to take appropriate actions and remove them from guest rooms. The Organizing Committee will gain exclusive access over the hotel from February 12, and an organization committee official said, "we can decide what is removed and placed in the guest rooms so that we don’t place any items that offend athletes, from not only China, but also any other nation”. Eventually both South Korea and China requested that their athletes stay at a different hotel, and the organizing committee obliged by changing their accommodations to the Sapporo Prince Hotel.

Scheduling
This event is being held around World and other major championships of some of the sports being contested. Included in this is the FIS Alpine World Ski Championships 2017 being held in St. Moritz, Switzerland, till 19 February (the opening of the games). Due to this some teams including among others Lebanon, have decided to not send their best team. The FIS Nordic World Ski Championships 2017 in Lahti, Finland will also happen during the games (between February 22 and March 5) which has caused Iran to not send a cross-country skiing team at all. Also, the reason cited for low ticket sales, is that many top athletes chose to focus on the world championships of their various disciplines.

References

External links
Official website

 
2017 in Japanese sport
2017 in multi-sport events
2017 in winter sports
21st century in Sapporo
2017
February 2017 sports events in Japan
International sports competitions hosted by Japan
Multi-sport events in Japan
Sports competitions in Sapporo